Report of the 1st Annual Symposium on Relaxed Improvisation, is an album by saxophonists Warne Marsh and Gary Foster with pianist Clare Fischer recorded in 1972 and released on the Revelation label.

Reception 

The Allmusic review noted "This LP certainly has an odd name. The music is relaxed but not sleepy ... this was really a recorded jam session in which no one paid much attention to the presence of the microphones. The recording quality is ok, if not state of the art, and the playing is not flawless, but the music overall is creative and well worthy of a listen by Warne Marsh fans".

Track listing 
 "It Could Happen to You" (Jimmy Van Heusen, Johnny Burke) – 8:00
 "Bluesy Rouge" (Warne Marsh, Clare Fischer, Gary Foster) – 10:00
 "In a Mellow Tone" (Duke Ellington) – 11:00
 "Yesterdays" (Jerome Kern, Otto Harbach) – 8:00

Personnel 
Warne Marsh – tenor saxophone
Clare Fischer – piano
Gary Foster – alto saxophone
Paul Ruhland – bass
John Tirabasso – drums

References 

Warne Marsh albums
Clare Fischer albums
Gary Foster (musician) albums
1973 albums
Revelation Records (jazz) albums